Members of the New South Wales Legislative Assembly who served in the 57th Parliament hold their seats from 2019 to 2023. They were elected at the 2019 state election on 23 March 2019. The Speaker was Shelley Hancock until May 2019 and then Jonathan O'Dea.

See also
Second Berejiklian ministry
Results of the 2019 New South Wales state election (Legislative Assembly)
Candidates of the 2019 New South Wales state election

References

Members of New South Wales parliaments by term
20th-century Australian politicians
New South Wales Legislative Assembly